Michael Ryan (born May 16, 1980) is an American former professional ice hockey forward who played in the National Hockey League. He is currently the Manager of Player Development for the Florida Panthers of the NHL. Ryan was selected by the Dallas Stars in the 2nd round (32nd overall) of the 1999 NHL Entry Draft.

Playing career
As a youth, Ryan played in the 1994 Quebec International Pee-Wee Hockey Tournament with a minor ice hockey team from South Shore.

Ryan was drafted by the Dallas Stars in the second round, 32nd overall, in the 1999 NHL Entry Draft. Ryan's rights were traded by the Stars to Buffalo, along with a draft pick, on March 10, 2003, in exchange for Stu Barnes.

After playing four seasons for Northeastern University, where he led the team in goals his final three years as a Husky, Ryan made his professional debut with the Sabres' American Hockey League affiliate, the Rochester Americans, in the 2003–04 season. He made his NHL debut with the Sabres in the 2006–07 season, appearing in 19 games. He scored his first two career NHL goals on March 2, 2007 against David Aebischer and the Montreal Canadiens in an 8-5 Sabres victory.

Ryan signed a one-year deal with the HC Dinamo Minsk on August 9, 2008, but reported to the Nashville Predators training camp as a free agent tryout on September 19, 2008. He was subsequently released.

On October 31, 2008, Ryan was signed by the Carolina Hurricanes to a 1-year deal and was assigned to their affiliate, the Albany River Rats. Ryan played in 18 games for the Hurricanes during the 2008–09 season and was re-signed to another one-year contract on July 1, 2009.

On October 24, 2010, Ryan signed a professional tryout (PTO) contract with the Springfield Falcons of the AHL.

On November 23, 2010, the Philadelphia Flyers signed Ryan to a one-year contract and assigned him to their AHL affiliate the Adirondack Phantoms. On August 9, 2011, the Buffalo Sabres signed Ryan to a one-year contract to play for their AHL affiliate, the Rochester Americans.

On May 10, 2012, Ryan left for Europe and signed a one-year contract with Ässät of the Finnish SM-liiga.

on June 20, 2013 Ryan signed one-year contract with new KHL team Medveščak Zagreb from Croatia.

Following the 2015–16 season in Finland, having played in only 3 games, Ryan announced his retirement from professional hockey. Beginning with the 2016–17 season, Ryan was selected as an assistant coach of the inaugural Springfield Thunderbirds of the American Hockey League, affiliate to the Florida Panthers.

Career statistics

References

External links

1980 births
Living people
Adirondack Phantoms players
Albany River Rats players
American men's ice hockey forwards
Ässät players
Boston College High School alumni
Buffalo Sabres players
Carolina Hurricanes players
Dallas Stars draft picks
Florida Panthers coaches
Ice hockey people from Massachusetts
KHL Medveščak Zagreb players
Northeastern Huskies men's ice hockey players
Rochester Americans players
Springfield Falcons players
Ice hockey people from Boston